Margarita is a municipality in Vera Department, Santa Fe Province, Argentina. The municipality was created on January 31, 1899. It is located 229 km from the provincial capital, Santa Fe de la Vera Cruz. As of 2010, the town of Margarita has 5,100 residents.

Notable residents
 Emir Faccioli,  football  player of the first division the boliviana.
 Marcos Maidana,  ex boxer 
 Roque Ramirez, football player

External links
 Provincial website information
 Social Center Sarmiento

Populated places in Santa Fe Province